The Cambridge University Catholic Chaplaincy, known as Fisher House after its patron, English martyr and Cambridge chancellor St John Fisher, is the Catholic chaplaincy for members of the University of Cambridge in England. Founded in 1896, since 1924 it has been located on the site of a former inn on Guildhall Street in Cambridge's city centre. The present Chaplain is Fr Paul Keane.

Operation

The chaplaincy is open to all Catholic members of the University, from undergraduates to fellows. In 2007, approximately 500 people attended its three Sunday Masses, with 20–30 people attending each weekday.

The finances of the chaplaincy, including building upkeep, are handled by the Cambridge University Catholic Association (CUCA), while the chaplains are appointed by the Oxford and Cambridge Catholic Education Board (OCCEB). The day-to-day running of the chaplaincy is handled by the chaplain and the student-run Fisher Society.

Regular events include the annual Fisher Mass (in recent years celebrated at Great St Mary's) and the Gilbey Requiem Mass, as well as the Fisher Society dinner, barbecue, and garden party at the nearby Dominican priory.

History

Foundation and Early Years (1871-1924)

Oxford and Cambridge universities opened their doors to Catholics in 1871 after the repeal of the Test Acts. However, the Congregation for the Propagation of the Faith had decreed that it would be next to impossible for the ancient English universities to be frequented without mortal sin, stressing the dangers of an increasing atmosphere of liberalism and scepticism. This decision was met with public outcry from the wealthy laity, who wished for their sons to attend Oxbridge colleges. After a petition led by the Catholic Cambridge fellow Baron Anatole von Hügel, this ban was lifted in 1895 with the condition that a chaplaincy be established to provide teaching on philosophy, history and religion.

As a result of this, the Universities Catholic Education Board (later OCCEB) was founded and Fr. Edmund Nolan was appointed chaplain. At the same time, the Fisher Society was founded by Cambridge students as a literary and debating society. Henry Fitzalan-Howard, 15th Duke of Norfolk purchased property in Cambridge and the chaplaincy was established there at St Edmund's House in November 1886. The very first lectures were given by Cuthbert Butler, OSB, entitled "Questions of the Day".

In 1899, CUCA was founded in order to purchase rooms for the chaplaincy at 2 Green Street. From here, the chaplaincy would then move to Llandaff House, near Downing College, under Monsignor Arthur Barnes. After a brief closure during the war, Fr. Bernard Marshall became chaplain at 50 Bridge Street, and then 2 Round Church Street, next to the Union.

Fisher House (1924-present)

In 1924, a Grade II listed pub called the Black Swan was purchased by CUCA for £10,000. The chaplaincy was moved there and named Fisher House. An interesting cluster of buildings, two old houses, joined at right angles to each other. One (housing library incl. student bar and kitchen, studies) overhangs the street and is 16th century. The other (housing dining room, kitchens, great chamber, living quarters) is reached via alleyways and is early 17th century with medieval cellars. The Great Chamber on the first floor, well lit with oak beams and antique furniture, paintings and tapestry, is one of the most pleasant rooms in Cambridge. In 1998, Mgr Alfred Gilbey, a previous chaplain who had worked to prevent Fisher House being demolished for development, was interred in the courtyard.

Fisher House was officially opened on 4 May 1925, the then feast of Blessed John Fisher. In 1937 the women's chaplaincy was founded at Lady Margaret House, but was not merged into Fisher House until 1966. Originally Mass was held in a chapel in an upper room, but in 1967 work was started on a new hall and side chapel.

The hall was originally rented out to market traders to provide income, but in 2008, after a successful appeal to raise £2 million, it became a permanent place of worship. This endowment fund included a personal donation of €3000 from Pope Benedict XVI, who had previously visited Fisher House to give a lecture in 1988 as Cardinal Joseph Ratzinger.

In 2005, a reconstruction of a  Cimabue crucifix was commissioned from the Hamilton Kerr Institute by the then-chaplain, Fr Alban McCoy. This 2m artwork was constructed according to contemporary medieval Italian methods, in particular those documented in Cennino Cennini’s  work Libro dell’Arte. The crucifix was completed in March 2008, installed at Fisher House and consecrated by Cardinal Cormac Murphy-O'Connor.

List of Chaplains
 Fr Edmund Nolan (1896–05)
 Mgr Arthur Barnes (1905–16)
 Fr James Bernard Marshall (1918–22)
 Fr John Lopes (1922–28)
 Fr George MacGillivray (1928–32)
 Mgr Alfred Gilbey (1932–65)
 Fr Richard Incledon (1965–77)
 Fr Maurice Couve de Murville (1977–82)
 Dom Christopher Jenkins OSB (1982–88)
 Fr John Osman (1988–94)
 Fr Allan White OP (1994–2000)
 Fr Alban McCoy OFM Conv (2000–13)
 Mgr Mark Langham (2013–20)
 Fr Robert Verrill OP, acting (2020–21)
Fr Alban Hood OSB (2021–22)
Sr Ann Swailes OP, acting (2022)
Fr Paul Keane (2022-)

See also 
Oxford University Catholic Chaplaincy
Oxford University Newman Society
Oxford and Cambridge Catholic Education Board

References

Further reading

External links 
 Fisher House website

Religious organizations established in 1896
Roman Catholic churches in Cambridge
Organisations associated with the University of Cambridge
Buildings and structures in Cambridge
University and college chapels in the United Kingdom
Roman Catholic chapels in England